Pelophylax demarchii is a species of frog in the family Ranidae. It is only known from its unspecific type locality, Eritrea. Its taxonomic status is unclear. Common name Eritrea pond frog has been coined for it.

Etymology
The specific name demarchii honours , an Italian naturalist, hydrobiologist, industrialist, and philanthropist.

Taxonomy
Pelophylax demarchii was described by Italian herpetologist  based on two syntypes, of which one is lost. It is uncertain whether it is a valid species; it most closely resembles Pelophylax ridibundus and might be its synonym.

Habitat and conservation
Ecological requirements, distribution, and current population status of this species are unknown. Consequently, it is listed as "data deficient" in the IUCN Red List of Threatened Species.

References

Pelophylax
Frogs of Africa
Vertebrates of Eritrea
Endemic fauna of Eritrea
Amphibians described in 1929
Taxa named by Giuseppe Scortecci
Taxonomy articles created by Polbot